Epia vulnerata is a species of moth in the family Bombycidae.

References

Natural History Museum Lepidoptera generic names catalog

Bombycidae
Moths described in 1868